Local elections were held in Pasig on May 9, 2016 within the Philippine general election. The voters elected for the elective local posts in the city: the mayor, vice mayor, the congressman, and the councilors, six of them in the two districts of the city.

Background
Bobby Eusebio, the former City Mayor and husband of the incumbent Mayor, Maribel Andaya Eusebio faced independent candidate Odylon Vincent Ramos for the mayoralty post in the polls. Bobby Eusebio had formerly been a mayor for two terms (2007-2010, 2010-2013). He filed for a third candidacy in 2013, but he withdrew when there was no formidable candidate. He was replaced by his wife, who won as Mayor in 2013 and was the incumbent during these 2016 elections. On the other hand, Ramos did not campaign.

Vice Mayor Iyo Christian C. Bernardo  sought reelection for his post. He ran under the Liberal Party, but was included in the ticket of mayoralty candidate Bobby Eusebio.

For House Representative, there was a three-way race for the Lone District of Pasig, which was disputed by Councilors Christian Sia and Ricky Eusebio, brother of Mayor Bobby Eusebio, and Mons Romulo, sister of then incumbent Pasig representative and then senatorial aspirant Roman Romulo.

11 out of the 12 eventual winners for City Councilor had already served in the Council in previous terms. 3 were returning, while 8 were incumbents. One of the candidates for the city council seat was neophyte Vico Sotto, the son of Vic Sotto and Coney Reyes. Kiko Rustia, a Survivor Philippines Castaway, TV Host and actor, also attempted to win a seat.

Candidates & Results

Mayor

Vice Mayor

Representative, Lone District

Councilors

1st District

|-
|colspan=7 bgcolor=black|

2nd District

|-
|colspan=9 bgcolor=black|

References

2016 Philippine local elections
Elections in Pasig
2016 elections in Metro Manila